Soroti University School of Medicine and Health Sciences (SUSMHS), is one of the three schools of Soroti University, one of Uganda's public universities. The school houses the university's medical school, the fifth public medical school in the country.

Location
The school's campus is on the premises of Soroti Regional Referral Hospital, in the central business district of the city of Soroti in Soroti District, Eastern Region. The coordinates of the school are 1°42'57.0"N, 33°36'50.0"E (Latitude:1.715833; Longitude:33.613889).

Overview
The school, whose official name is Soroti University School of Medicine and Health Sciences (SUSMHS), is organised in over 20 distinct departments, each led by a departmental head. The areas of study include human medicine, nursing, dentistry, biomedical science, pharmacy, and allied health professionals. The objectives of the school include the training of competent health professionals, who will provide the required health care and relieve the disease and morbidity burden in the region and the country.

Undergraduate courses
The following undergraduate courses are offered:
 
 Bachelor of Medicine and Bachelor of Surgery
 Bachelor of Science in Biomedical Science
 Bachelor of Science in Nursing Science
 Bachelor of Science in Biomedical Laboratory Technology
 Bachelor of Science in Biomedical Engineering
 Bachelor of Dentistry
 Bachelor of Pharmacy
 Diploma in Pharmacy.

See also
 Medical Schools
 Uganda Medical Schools
 Uganda Hospitals

References

External links
 Soroti University Homepage
  MEPI To Facilitate Research And Improve Medical Education In Uganda
 Doctors get offers they can’t resist

Medical schools in Uganda
Educational institutions established in 2015
School of Medicine and Health Sciences
2015 establishments in Uganda